Vipul R. Patel, FACS is the founder and Medical Director of the Florida Hospital Global Robotics Institute, founder and Vice President of the Society of Robotic Surgery, and founder and Editor Emeritus of The Journal of Robotic Surgery. He is board certified by the American Urological Association and specializes in  robotic surgery for prostate cancer.  As of February, 2018 he performed his 11,000th robotic-assisted prostatectomy. The large volume of prostatectomies he has performed has enabled him to amass a large amount of statistical evidence regarding the efficacy of robotic techniques which has been used in developing and refining techniques. Patel credits the use of robotic assisted surgery with helping surgeons achieve better surgical outcomes with the "trifecta" of cancer control, continence and sexual function. In the course of his career Patel has led and participated in studies that have resulted in developing improved outcomes for robotic surgery and urologic treatment.

Biography
In January, 2008 Patel left Ohio and moved to Florida where he became Medical Director of the Global Robotics Institute at Florida Hospital Celebration Health and Director of Urologic Oncology at the Florida Hospital Cancer Institute.

In 2012 Patel founded the International Prostate Cancer Foundation, a charitable institution with the goals of promoting research in testing for genetic predisposition to prostate cancer, patient and physician education, and global screening for early detection of prostate cancer. Patel serves as chairman of the foundation.

Academic career
Patel has played a major role in training and mentoring students in robotic technologies and in establishing robotic surgery programs in many countries. He was instrumental in developing guidelines for training and credentialing the next generation of robotic surgeons.

He leads the robotic training team at the Nicholson Center, is a Professor of Urology at the University of Central Florida, and a Clinical Associate Professor of Urology at Nova Southeastern University.

He wrote the first textbook on robotic urologic surgery, now in a second edition.

He has helped to establish and train robotic surgery units around the world. For example, in 2004 he established a robotic surgery department at the Hospital Kuala Lumpur in Malaysia. In 2008 he trained the first Russian robotic surgery team and performed the first robotic prostatectomy in Russia, for which he was inducted into the Russian Academy of Sciences

Works

Textbooks as editor
 Patel, Vipul. (2015). Robotic Urologic Surgery. (2nd ed- Chinese Translation). Beijing, China: World Publishing Xi'an Corporation Ltd.
 Patel, Vipul. (2012). Robotic Urologic Surgery. (2nd ed.). London, England: Springer.
 Patel, V., Ramalingam, M. (2009) Operative Atlas of Laparoscopic Reconstructive Urology. London, England: Springer.
 Patel, Vipul. (2007). Robotic Urologic Surgery. London, England: Springer.

Articles
Patel has published more than one hundred articles in scientific and medical journals.  The most cited include:

References

Year of birth missing (living people)
Living people
American medical journalists
Baylor College of Medicine alumni